Stacey Hillyard (born 5 September 1969) is an English former professional snooker player, who won the 1984 amateur World Women's Snooker Championship at the age of 15, making her the youngest winner of the tournament. She reached the final of the competition on five further occasions.

Biography

Hillyard started playing snooker on a full size table at the YMCA club in Winton, aged 12. She played her first competitive women's snooker event in 1982, and lost on the final  to the reigning world champion Sue Foster.

Hillyard won the 1984 Amateur World Women's Snooker Championship aged 15, defeating Canadian player Natalie Stelmach 4–1 in the final. Although Hillyard reached the final five additional times, she did not win the event again. Three of the finals were lost to Allison Fisher, the dominant player of the era.

In 1985 in Bournemouth, Hillyard, still 15, became the first woman to compile a century break (114) in a competitive snooker match.

When the World Professional Billiards and Snooker Association (WPBSA) opened membership for events to anyone over the age of 16 in 1990, Hillyard was one of six women to join, along with Allison Fisher, Ann-Marie Farren, Georgina Aplin, Karen Corr, and Maureen McCarthy, whilst 443 men joined at the same time. At the 1991 Dubai Classic, Hillyard started in the second qualifying round, and defeated Dermot McGlinchey, Paul Hefford, Chris Carpenter, to progress to the 5th round, in which she lost 1–5 to Alex Higgins. Her last year on the WPBSA circuit was the 1994–95 snooker season, concluding with a 0–5 loss to Andrew Duff in the first qualifying round for the 1995 British Open.

On 23 February 1992, Hillyard recorded a new highest break in competitive women's snooker, making 137 during the General Portfolio Women's Classic held in Aylesbury.

Away from snooker, she served as a police officer.

Career finals

{| width=100%
| valign=top width=40% align=left |

Doubles and team events
1991 World Masters Women's Doubles – winner (with Allison Fisher)
1991 World Mixed Doubles Final – Runner-up (with Stephen Hendry) – lost 4–5 to Allison Fisher and Steve Davis.

References

English snooker players
Female snooker players
1969 births
Living people